The Plymouth Pronto was a small concept car released in 1997 by Plymouth. The design was modern for its time along with several retro-style touches. The front of the Pronto resembled that of the Plymouth Prowler. The Pronto also featured a roll-back fabric top. The Pronto never went into production, but its design inspired two more concept cars, the Plymouth Pronto Spyder and the Plymouth Pronto Cruizer (neither ever saw production). The Pronto's design also inspired that of the Chrysler PT Cruiser, which went into production in 2001. Had the Plymouth marque not been discontinued, the PT Cruiser would have been sold as a Plymouth.

References

Pronto
Retro-style automobiles